The following railroads operate in the U.S. state of Utah.

Common freight carriers
BNSF Railway (BNSF): trackage rights over the UP
Salt Lake City Southern Railroad (SL)
Salt Lake, Garfield and Western Railway (SLGW)
Savage Bingham and Garfield Railroad (SBG)
Union Pacific Railroad (UP): Cache Valley, Cane Creek, Cedar City, Comstock, Evanston, Green River, Lakeside, Lynndyl, Malad, Ogden, Pleasant Valley, Provo, Salt Lake, Shafter, Sharp, and Sunnyside Subdivisions
Utah Railway (UTAH)
Utah Central Railway (UCRY)

Private freight carriers
Deseret Western Railway
Kennecott Utah Copper

Passenger carriers

Amtrak (AMTK): California Zephyr
Heber Valley Railroad
San Pedro, Los Angeles & Salt Lake Railroad
Utah Transit Authority FrontRunner & TRAX
Wild Kingdom Train

Defunct railroads

Private freight carriers
Boston Consolidated Mining Company
Crescent Mining Company
Independent Coal and Coke Company

Passenger carriers
Alta Scenic Railway

Electric 
Bamberger Railroad (B)
Bamberger Electric Railroad (BE)
Bingham Central Railway
Consolidated Railway and Power Company
East Bench Street Railway
Emigration Canyon Railroad
Great Salt Lake and Hot Springs Railway
Logan Rapid Transit Company
Ogden City Railway
Ogden Electric Railway
Ogden and Hot Springs Railway
Ogden, Logan and Idaho Railway (OL&I)
Ogden and Northwestern Railroad
Ogden Rapid Transit Company
Popperton Place and Fort Douglas Rapid Transit Company
Salt Lake City Railroad
Salt Lake, Garfield and Western Railway (SLGW)
Salt Lake Light and Traction Company
Salt Lake and Ogden Railway
Salt Lake Rapid Transit Company
Salt Lake Terminal Company
Salt Lake and Utah Railroad (SL&U, SLU)
Salt Lake and Utah Valley Railway
Utah Idaho Central Railroad (UIC)
Utah Idaho Central Railway (UIC)
Utah Light and Railway Company
Utah Light and Traction Company
Utah Rapid Transit Company
West Side Railway
West Side Rapid Transit Company

Notes

References
Association of American Railroads (2003), Railroad Service in Utah (PDF). Retrieved May 11, 2005.
UtahRails.net Retrieved March 10, 2006.
List of Utah Railroads at UtahRails.net Retrieved June 9, 2006.
Utah Railroads Index page at UtahRails.net Retrieved June 9, 2006.

 
Utah
 
Railroads